Southampton Island (Inuktitut: Shugliaq) is a large island at the entrance to Hudson Bay at Foxe Basin. One of the larger members of the Arctic Archipelago, Southampton Island is part of the Kivalliq Region in Nunavut, Canada. It is the 34th largest island in the world and Canada's ninth largest island. The only settlement on Southampton Island is Coral Harbour (population 1035, Canada 2021 Census), called Salliq in Inuktitut.

Southampton Island is one of the few Canadian areas, and the only area in Nunavut, that does not use daylight saving time.

History
Historically speaking, Southampton Island is famous for its now-extinct inhabitants, the Sadlermiut (modern Inuktitut Sallirmiut "Inhabitants of Salliq"), who were the last vestige of the Tuniit or Dorset. The Tuniit, a pre-Inuit culture, officially went ethnically and culturally extinct in 1902-03 when infectious disease killed all of the Sallirmiut in a matter of weeks.

The island's first recorded visit by Europeans was in 1613 by Welsh explorer Thomas Button.

At the beginning of the 20th century, the island was repopulated by Aivilingmiut from Naujaat and Chesterfield Inlet, influenced to do so by whaler Captain George Comer and others. Baffin Islanders arrived 25 years later. John Ell, who as a young child travelled with his mother Shoofly on Comer's schooners, eventually became the most famous of Southampton Island's re-settled population.

The Native Point archaeological site at the mouth of Native Bay is the largest Sadlermiut site on the island.

Geology 
Southampton Island does have geological resources that are of scientific and industrial interest.

However, full knowledge of the island is still lacking according to the Nunavut government.

Geography
It is separated from the Melville Peninsula by Frozen Strait. Other waterways surrounding the island include Roes Welcome Sound to the west, Bay of Gods Mercy in the southwest, Fisher Strait in the south, Evans Strait in the southeast, and Foxe Channel in the east.

Hansine Lake is located in the far north. Bell Peninsula is located in the southeastern part of the island. Mathiassen Mountain, a member of the Porsild Mountains, is the island's highest peak. The island's shape is vaguely similar to that of Newfoundland.

Climate
Southampton Island has a severe subarctic climate (Köppen Dfc) which transitions into a tundra climate (ET). Like almost all of Nunavut, Southampton Island is entirely above the tree line. Coral Harbour has never gone above freezing in January, February and March (although the latter has recorded . Due to the frozen nature of Hudson Bay, there is a severe seasonal lag until June, especially compared to more continental areas such as Fairbanks despite much sunshine and perpetual twilight at night. Due to the drop of solar strength and the absence of warm water even in summer, temperatures still drop off very fast as September approaches. Cold extremes are severe, but in line with many areas even farther south in Canada's interior.

Fauna
East Bay Migratory Bird Sanctuary and Harry Gibbons Migratory Bird Sanctuary are located on the island and are important breeding sites for the lesser snow goose (Anser caerulescens caerulescens). The island is also the site of two Important Bird Areas (IBAs), the Boas River wetlands in the southwest and East Bay/Native Bay in the southeast. Both host large summer colonies of the lesser snow goose, together comprising over 10% of the world's snow goose population, with Boas River site alone hosting over 500.000 individuals nesting there. Smaller, but also important, are the colonies of the brent goose (Branta bernicla) and numerous other polar bird species there. Southampton Island is one of two main summering grounds known for bowhead whales in Hudson Bay.

Gallery

References

Further reading

 Bird, J. Brian. Southampton Island. Ottawa: E. Cloutier, 1953.
 Brack, D. M. Southampton Island Area Economic Survey With Notes on Repulse Bay and Wager Bay. Ottawa: Area & Community Planning Section, Industrial Division, Dept. of Northern Affairs and National Resources, 1962.
 Mathiassen, Therkel. Contributions to the Physiography of Southampton Island. Copenhagen: Gyldendalske Boghandel, 1931.
 Parker, G. R. An Investigation of Caribou Range on Southampton Island, Northwest Territories. Ottawa: Information Canada, 1975.
 Pickavance, J. R. 2006. "The Spiders of East Bay, Southampton Island, Nunavut, Canada". Arctic. 59, no. 3: 276–282.
 Popham RE. 1953. "A Comparative Analysis of the Digital Patterns of Eskimo from Southampton Island". American Journal of Physical Anthropology. 11, no. 2: 203–13.
 Popham RE, and WD Bell. 1951. "Eskimo crania from Southampton Island". Revue Canadienne De Biologie / ̐ưedit̐ưee Par L'Universit̐ưe De Montr̐ưeal. 10, no. 5: 435–42.
 Sutton, George Miksch, and John Bonner Semple. The Exploration of Southampton Island. Pittsburgh: Carnegie Institute, 1932.
 Sutton, George Miksch. The Birds of Southampton Island. Pittsburgh: Carnegie Institute, 1932.
 VanStone, James W. The Economy and Population Shifts of the Eskimos of Southampton Island. Ottawa: Northern Co-ordination and Research Centre, Dept. of Northern Affairs and National Resources, 1959.

Islands of Foxe Basin
Hudson's Bay Company trading posts in Nunavut
Inhabited islands of Kivalliq Region